Oh Darling Yeh Hai India is a 1995 Indian musical parody film directed by Ketan Mehta, starring Shah Rukh Khan, Deepa Sahi, Jaaved Jaffrey and Amrish Puri. It also stars Anupam Kher in a supporting role.

Plot
Don Quixote (Amrish Puri) is a don who plans on selling India in a widely publicised auction. His plan is simple — kidnap the president (Anupam Kher), replace him with a lookalike (also Anupam Kher), throw a scare and "force" the fake president to sell India. Hero (Shah Rukh Khan) is new to Bombay and broke. Miss India (Deepa Sahi) is busy living it up the night she meets Hero. They meet and decide to spend the night entertaining each other in any way possible.

Meanwhile, Don Quixote's son Prince (Javed Jaffrey) has set his eyes on Miss India, who shows no interest in him. The night turns out to be an adventurous one for Hero and Miss India. Hero discovers that Miss India's father is a drunkard who wants her to enter prostitution, while Miss India discovers that Hero has a brain tumor. When they find out Quixote's plans, they decide to save the president.

Quixote is killed in some riots and Prince takes his throne. Prince decides to continue his father's plan. Hero and Miss India, in disguise, manage to enter the auditorium where the auction is taking place. Prince, in his father's don attires, suddenly makes an entry with his henchmen. Hero, Miss India, and their friends successfully overpower the cronies. Some people previously rescued by Hero and Miss India kill the fake president, pushing a hose in his mouth, causing his stomach to inflate and explode. When Prince attacks Hero and Miss India, causing all three of them to smash the glass and fall out of the building, Hero and Miss India create a parachute from an Indian Flag, taken from Prince's body. During the jump, Prince falls to his death. Hero and Miss India land on the roof of a double-decker bus, and Hero declares that he is glad to be alive. When Miss India reminds him that he has a brain tumor, Hero tells her that the X-ray she saw was taken a year and a half ago.

Cast
Shahrukh Khan as Hero
Deepa Sahi as Miss India
Amrish Puri as Don Qixote
Jaaved Jaffrey as Prince of Don
Anupam Kher as President of India / Nathuram
Sadashiv Amrapurkar as Bidder
Kader Khan as Bidder
Paresh Rawal as Bidder
Raza Murad as Bidder
Anil Nagrath as Bidder
Ashish Vidyarthi
Ranjeet as Bidder
Tiku Talsania as Havaldar
Shrivallabh Vyas
Tom Alter as Bidder
Tinnu Anand
Sanjay Mishra
Geeta Kapoor as herself
Rajesh Jais
Ravi Jhankal
Ahmed Khan
Prashant Narayanan

Soundtrack

References

External links

1995 films
1990s Hindi-language films
Films directed by Ketan Mehta
Films scored by Ranjit Barot
Indian satirical films
Indian parody films